There is a slightly large community of Hungarians in Finland.

History
Prior to the late 1960s, most Hungarians came to Finland due to family, work or cultural and religious reasons. In the late 1980s and early 1990s, Finland took some Hungarian refugees from Romania. Since the 1990s, many Hungarians came to Finland as guest workers or exchange students. Before the 1980s, there were only 150 Hungarians in Finland.

In 2014, there were 2,600 people in Finland who spoke Hungarian, some of them coming from Transylvania. In the 2000s, Hungarians were employed by Nokia and in recent years, Hungarians have moved to, among other places, Ostrobothnia to work in the grocery sector. Many of the Hungarian immigrants to Finland have been musicians.

Hungarian organizations in Finland
Bóbita ry is the most active Hungarian organization in Finland, located in the Helsinki region.

Notable Hungarians in Finland

 Réka Szilvay - violist
 Johanna Debreczeni - singer
 Aladár Paasonen - soldier
 Kati Kovács - cartoonist
 Sami Garam - chef
 Károly Garam - cellist
 Lajos Garam - violist
 Tamás Gruborovics - footballer
 Nándor Mikola - painter
 Paavo von Pandy - soldier
 Géza Szilvay - violist
 Aladár Valmari - writer
 Ville Valo - singer
 Benedek Oláh - tennis player
 Harri István Mäki - writer

See also 
 Finland–Hungary relations

References

Ethnic groups in Finland
 
Finland